Europapark may refer to:
 Europa-Park, a theme park in Rust, Germany
 Europapark, a neighborhood in Groningen, Netherlands
 Groningen Europapark railway station, a train station in Groningen, Netherlands